Mar Podippara Ouseph Placid Malpan also known as Placidachan (3 October 1899 – 27 April 1985) was an Indian Syriac Catholic priest and scholar of the St. Thomas Christian community. He was a scholar in East Syriac language and liturgy. A book published on the tenth anniversary of his death calls him one of the greatest ecclesiastical luminaries of the 20th century in India. He was a member of the Syro Malabar Church and was ordained a priest from the Eastern Catholic religious institute of the Carmelites of Mary Immaculate (C.M.I.). He was also a theologian, liturgist, orator, professor, ecumenist, and author.

He worked hard to remove the liturgical latinisation of the Syro Malabar Catholic Church and also was vital in reunifying the Malankara Syrian Catholic Church to the Catholic fold. He wrote more than thirty seven books and numerous articles on Saint Thomas Christians in languages including  English, Malayalam, German and Latin. He was a Member of the Pontifical commission for codifying Canon Law, Syriac Language examiner of Kerala University, Consultant to the Congregation for the Oriental Churches, Member of Pontifical commission for restoring the Holy Qurbana of Syro Malabar Church, Professor of Pontifical Oriental Institute and Pontifical Urbaniana University, Rome, Consultant for preparing the agenda of Second Vatican Council. He had doctorates in Philosophy, Theology and Canon Law which he acquired during his time in Rome.

Early life 
Placid was born Joseph (Kochauseppachan) into the Podipara family as the fifth and last child of Chacko and Rosamma in the village, Arpookara, near Kottayam in the Southern Indian state of Kerala. He lost his mother at the age of four and his father at the age of seven. He completed his schooling from St. Ephrem's High School, Mannanam which was run by Syrian Carmelite fathers (later CMI). He entered the novitiate in 1918 and was given a new name, Placid of St. Joseph. Later he was sent to St. Joseph's Seminary, Mangalore run by the Italian Jesuits, for his ecclesiastical studies where he did two years of philosophy and four years of theology. He was ordained priest on 3 December 1927 at Mangalore and celebrated his first Holy Qurbana in St. Joseph's Monastery chapel, Mannanam. As his superiors needed someone qualified to teach in the major seminary, he was sent to Rome for further studies. During his first stint in Rome, which lasted only two years, he acquired doctorates in the fields philosophy, theology and canon law.

Final years 

He met with an accident in 1960 which left him with a limp until the end of his life. He returned from Rome in 1980 and continued his studies from Chethipuzha. Towards the last days he was bed-ridden due to partial paralysis which affected his power of speech. He died on 27 April 1985.

Legacy 

Father Placid's description of the St. Thomas Christians as "Hindu in Culture, Christian in Religion and Oriental in Worship" continues to be quoted.

Major works 

1. The Syrian Church of Malabar: Its Catholic Communion

2. The Church of Seleucia and its Catholic Roman Communion

3. The South Indian Apostolate of St. Thomas

4. The Efforts for Reunion in Malankara, South India

5. Portuguese Religious Conquests in Malabar under the Diocese of Cochin during the Sixteenth Century.

6. A Short History of the Malabar Church

7. The Malabarians

8. The Malankarians

9. The Thomas Christians

10. The Varthamanappusthakam (Translation)

11. The Malabar Christians

12. The Hierarchy of the Syro-Malabar Church

13. Four Essays on the Pre-Seventeenth Century Church of St. Thomas Christians of India

14. The Rise and Decline of the Indian Church of the St. Thomas Christians

15. The Latin Rite Christians of Malabar

16. De Fontibus Iuris Ecclesiastici Syro-Malankarensium (Latin)

17. Fontes Iuris Canonici Syro-Malankarensium (Latin)

18. The Social and Socio-Ecclesiastical Customs of the Syrian Christians of India

19. The Catholic Syrians of Malabar and the Motu Proprio Crebrae Allatae

20. Oriental Marriage Legislation

21. The  Syro-Malabarians, their life and their Activities

22. Hindu in Culture, Christian in Religion, Oriental in Worship

23. The Thomas Christians and Adaptation

24. The Individuality of the Malabar Church

25. The Canonical Sources of the Syro-Malabar Church.

26. Memorandum to His Eminence Eugene Cardinal Tisserant

27. The Present Syro-Malabar Liturgy: Menezian or Rozian?

28. Notes on some Clerical and Liturgical Matters

29. Further Extension of the Malabar Ecclesiastical Jurisdiction in India

30. The Thomas Christians and their Syriac Treasures

31. The Thomas Christians of Malabar and the Chaldean Liturgy

32. Reflections on Liturgy

33. The Christology of Babai the Great and the Non-Catholic East Syrians or Nestorians

34. Mariology of the Church of the East

35. Malayalam and Syriac and the Syro-Malabarians

36. Eugene Cardinal Tisserant - Reminiscences

37. നവംബർ മാസത്തിലും തോമ്മാശ്ലീഹാ (The Remembrance of Apostle St. Thomas in November too)

38. മാർത്തോമ്മാശ്ലീഹായും പാലയൂർ പള്ളിയും (Mar Toma Sliha and the Church at Palayoor)

39. കേരള നസ്രാണികളും ദേശസഞ്ചാരികളും (Kerala Nazranees and the World Travellers)

40. ഉദയമ്പേരൂർ സൂനഹദോസ് (Synod of Diamper)

41. മൈലാപ്പൂർ (Mylapore)

42. കേരളത്തിലെ മാർത്തോമ്മാ ക്രിസ്ത്യാനികൾ (St. Thomas Christians of Kerala)

43. മാർത്തോമ്മാ ക്രിസ്ത്യാനികളുടെ വളർച്ചയും തളർച്ചയും (The Rise and Decline of the Indian Church of the St. Thomas Christians)

44. മാർത്തോമ്മാ ക്രിസ്ത്യാനികളും അനുരൂപണവും (St. Thomas Christians and Adaptation)

45. കേരളസഭയുടെ വ്യക്തിത്വം (The Individuality of the Church of Kerala)

46. നമ്മുടെ റീത്ത് (Our Rite)

47. പുരാതനമായ ഒരു കൈയെഴുത്തു പുസ്തകം (An Ancient Manuscript in Syriac dated 1708)

48. അന്ത്യോക്യാ പാത്രിയർക്കീസ് (The Patriarch of Antioch)

49. ദൈവമാതാവും യാക്കോബായ വിശ്വാസവും (The Mother of God and the Jacobite Faith)

50. പൗരസ്ത്യസഭകൾ (Oriental Churches)

51. അകത്തോലിക്കു വാദങ്ങൾക്ക് കത്തോലിക്കു പ്രത്യുത്തരം (Catholic Responses to the arguments of non-Catholics)

52. യാക്കോബായക്കാരുടെ പുനരൈക്യം (The Reunion of the Jacobites)

53. എഫേസൂസ് സൂനഹദോസും റോമാമാർപ്പാപ്പായും (The Council of Ephesus and the Roman Pontiff)

54. ഏകസ്വഭാവവാദം (Monophysitism)

55. മാർപ്പാപ്പായുടെ പരമാധികാരവും അപ്രമാദിത്വവും (The Primacy and the Infallibility of Pope)

56. തിരുസഭയും മാർപ്പാപ്പായും (The Church and Pope)

57. ഓർത്തഡോക്സ് സഭയും പരമാധികാരവും (The Orthodox Church and Primacy)

58. കൂനൻ കുരിശിനു മുൻപ് (Before Coonan Cross)

59. നമ്മുടെ കണ്ണുകൾ ഭാഗ്യമുള്ളവ (Blessed are Our Eyes!)

60. അന്ത്യോക്യായിൽ എന്തുണ്ട് ? (What is there in Antioch ?)

61. കേരളസഭയൂം ഇതരസഭകളും (Church of Kerala and other Churches)

62. ചെങ്കടലിലെ സ്മരണകൾ (Reminiscences of Read Sea)

63. ഗുരുപ്പട്ട സുവർണ്ണ ജൂബിലി (Sacerdotal Golden Jubilee of His Holiness Pope Pius XI in 1929)

64. ഇന്നത്തെ ബേസ്ലഹം (Bethlehem today)

65. ലൂതറിനു മുമ്പുണ്ടായിരുന്ന വേദപുസ്തകം (Holy Bible before Luther)

66. തത്വപ്രകാശിക (An Aid to Reasonable Thinking)

67. മിശിഹായുടെ രാജത്വം (Kingship of Christ)

68. കത്തോലിക്കാ മതപഠനം (Catechism of the Catholic Church)

69. പരിശുദ്ധ ത്രിത്വം (Holy Trinity)

70. കത്തോലിക്കാ വിദ്യാലയങ്ങളിലെ പണിമുടക്ക് (Problem of Strike by Catholic Students of Catholic Educational Institutions)

71. രണ്ട് അവിഭാജ്യ ഘടകങ്ങൾ (Two Inseparable Factors: Clergy and Laity)

72. പ്രാർത്ഥന (Prayer)

73. വി. ഫ്രാൻസിസ്കോസിന്റെ മൂന്നാം സഭ (Franciscan Third order)

74. പ. കന്യാമറിയത്തിന്റെ സ്വർഗ്ഗാരോഹണം (The Assumption of the Blessed Virgin Mary)

75. മരിയഭക്തിയും കേരള സുറിയാനി കത്തോലിക്കരും (Marian Devotion and the Syrian Catholics of Kerala)

76. സ്വകാര്യസ്വത്ത് (Private Property)

77. കാല്പാടുകൾ (Footprints (of St. Thomas the Apostle and St. Francis Xavier))

78. കുടമാളൂർ ചരിത്രത്തിലൂടെ (Kudamaloor through history)

79. കുർബാന: ബലിയും ദിവ്യഭോജനവും (Qurbana: Sacrifice and Divine Meal)

80. Die Thomas-Christen (German)

References 

Syro-Malabar priests
Writers from Kottayam
Malayali people
1899 births
1985 deaths